The International Grand Prix Doha was a one day road cycling race held in Qatar. It was part of UCI Asia Tour in category 1.1 in 2005 and 2006 1.2 in 2008.

Winners

References

UCI Asia Tour races
Recurring sporting events established in 2004
Recurring sporting events disestablished in 2008
2004 establishments in Qatar
Cycle races in Qatar
Defunct cycling races in Qatar